Lynn Jeanne Bush (born December 30, 1948) is a senior judge of the United States Court of Federal Claims, appointed to that court in 1998 by President Bill Clinton.

Early life, education, and career
Born in Little Rock, Arkansas, to John E. Bush III and Alice (Saville) Bush, Bush received a B.A. from Antioch College in 1970, after which she received a Thomas J. Watson Fellowship, followed by a J.D. from the Georgetown University Law Center in 1976.

Admitted to the Arkansas Bar in 1976 and to the District of Columbia Bar in 1977, she was a trial attorney for the Commercial Litigation Branch, Civil Division, U.S. Department of Justice from 1976 to 1987, and then moved to the Department of the Navy, where she was senior trial attorney for Naval Facilities Engineering Command until 1989, and counsel for Engineering Field Activity Chesapeake until 1996. She then became an administrative judge for the U.S. Department of Housing and Urban Development Board of Contract Appeals from 1996 until 1998.

Federal judicial service
On June 22, 1998, Bush was nominated by President Bill Clinton to be a judge of the United States Court of Federal Claims. She was confirmed by the U.S. Senate on October 26, 1998, and received her commission that day. She assumed senior status on October 22, 2013.

Personal life
Bush has one son, Brian Bush Ferguson.

References

External links
United States Court of Federal Claims page on Lynn J. Bush

1948 births
African-American judges
African-American women lawyers
African-American lawyers
American women judges
Lawyers from Little Rock, Arkansas
Antioch College alumni
Georgetown University Law Center alumni
Arkansas lawyers
Lawyers from Washington, D.C.
Judges of the United States Court of Federal Claims
United States Article I federal judges appointed by Bill Clinton
Living people
Watson Fellows
20th-century American women judges
20th-century American judges
21st-century American women judges
21st-century American judges
21st-century American women